Stratford STEM Magnet High School (formerly Stratford Comprehensive High School) is a magnet school in Nashville, Tennessee, operated by Metropolitan Nashville Public Schools. It serves approximately 800 students.  In March 2012, the Metro Board of Education dropped the "Comprehensive" title from all its zoned schools to reflect the district's new emphases on smaller learning communities and thematic career academies. The school is noteworthy as MNPS's only STEM high school. The school colors are White, Gray, Black, and Orange. In early 2019, the principal was put on paid administrative leave over Grade Discrepancy Allegations, though they were later debunked.

Stratford was most known by students from 2018 to 2020 as the school who couldn't catch a break. Many false bombing reports were called into the building, resulting in the infamous Walk to the Church event where students were forced to take a painstaking walk to a church where they stayed for a long period before being allowed back on campus.

Academies and Pathways
Stratford STEM Magnet High School has two academies, each with distinct pathways. Students are required to select a pathway by the 10th grade.

Academy of Science and Engineering (A.S.E.)
Interdisciplinary Science Pathway
Engineering Pathway
Biotechnology Pathway

Academy of National Security and the Science of Teaching (N.S.S.T.)
National Security Technology Pathway (Criminal Justice/Forensic Science)
The Science of Teaching Pathway
(Changed in the 2020–21 school year, The NSST Academy was formally the Academy of National Security and Safety Technologies which included Criminal Justice/Forensic Science and Computer Simulation/Game Programming Pathways. The Computer Simulation/Game Programming Pathways were cut due to funding issues)

Notable Staff 

 Dr. Michael J Steele (Head Principal)
 Dr. Avery Finch (Freshman Academy Principal)

Notable alumni
 Cory Fleming, former NFL player
 Ken Johnson, former NFL player

References

External links
 Official Website of Stratford STEM Magnet High School
 Academies at Stratford STEM Magnet High School
 Metro Nashville Public Schools
 Academies of Nashville Blog page for Stratford High School

Public high schools in Tennessee
Schools in Nashville, Tennessee